Dr. Jan Rejsa (September 16, 1886 Prague - December 9, 1971 Prague) was a Czech poet, writer, editor and literary columnist.

Life
He was born into a police council family, which he believed was descended from a noble Lusatian family that later colonized Silesia. This ancestry led him to write under the pseudonyms Jan Rejsa Kolkovský and Jan Rejsa of Kolkovic, from a character presented to his ancestors by Rudolf II, Holy Roman Emperor in 1579.

He graduated from the Academic Gymnasium in Prague, where he taught history. After graduating in 1906 he worked as a clerk for various societies. From 1916 he studied at Charles University in Prague, reading Czech history, literature, art history, archeology and the culture of ancient France. He graduated in 1922, defending the work of early Christian paintings in the Roman catacombs. Also undertook a study tour to Germany, Austria and Italy. He was also interested in genealogy and heraldry.

He is buried in Prague's Olšany Cemetery.

Work
Contributed to various magazines (Apollon, Ark, Goal Life Czech Word, Work, People's Leaves, Literary Circle, the National Newspaper). His first poems (published in 1927) were inspired by ancient and Renaissance motifs in the academic eclectic style. Later he moved to the Neo (i.e. decadent).

Edited Proceedings of the Unity Descendants of White Mountain Exiles in Prague in the years 1931–1938.

Published poet and science fiction author.

Writings
 Čtyři renaissanční sonety, Prague at own expense, 1927, bibliophile
 Na březích Ilissu, Prague: Miloš Procházka, 1928 - Poems
 Obraz sv. Dorothey, Prague: [Ser], 1930
 Hudba země, Prague: A. Praise 1933 - Poems
 Duše v plamenech, Moravian Ostrava: [sn], 1935 - Poems
 Efeméry : imaginární novely, Prague: Mor. Ostrava: Library Literary Circle in Ostrava-Vítkovice 1937
 Neznámý elixír : hradčanské romaneto, Litomysl: John R. Veselík 1940
 Hvězda na východě : básně městu Litomyšli, Litomysl: John R. Veselík 1940
 Most vidin, Prague: O. Pied 1944

Translations
 Paul Gauguin: Noa Noa, KDA, Volume 52, Prague: Kamilla Neumann, 1919

References

Czech poets
1886 births
1971 deaths
Charles University alumni
Burials at Olšany Cemetery